Instituto Salesiano (or IS, Instituto Salesiano da Imaculada Conceição) is a Catholic elementary school through secondary school in São Lourenço (St. Lawrence's Parish), Macau. The school is one of the oldest educational institutions founded in Macau. The medium of instruction is English, although some particular subjects such as Chinese Literature and Chinese History are taught in Cantonese. It is a member of the Macau Catholic Schools Association.

History
Instituto Salesiano was established in 1906, during the Qing dynasty, by Fr. Louis Versiglia. The school is run by the Salesians of Don Bosco, aims at giving the students a complete and balanced education in different aspects. The campus, front of St. Lorenz Church, was originally owned by the British East India Company. Since 1976, the school has become an exam center of General Certificate of Education as well as an exam center of City and Guilds of London Institute.

Principals

School Hymn
The anthem was transcribed by Austrian missionary Fr. Guilherme Schmid
School Anthem of Instituto Salesiano of Macau 澳門慈幼中學校歌(Chinese)

ISSC
Instituto Salesiano Student Council, established in 1997, is the officially recognized student organization of the school.
ISSC holds singing competition regularly every year
("Music's Demo" in 2010,"Blue's End" in 2011)
Website:http://www.ism.edu.mo/issc/index.htm

Notable alumni
Domingos Lam  (The first Chinese born bishop in the Roman Catholic Diocese of Macau.)
Domingos Chan  (Macau professional football player who plays as a goalkeeper for Macau team. He currently plays for Sun Hei in the Hong Kong First Division League.)
Ao Man-long (ex- Secretary for Transport and Public Works of Macau)
Fr. Pedro Ho (The director-general of Bosco Youth Service Network.)
Brian Leong Ka Hang (Macau Top Footballer of the Year of 2011.)

See also

Salesians of Don Bosco
Yuet Wah College
Salesian English School

References

External links
 Instituto Salesiano of Macau
 ISSC 
    Facebook page of Instituto Salesiano

Boys' schools in China
Catholic schools in Macau
Educational institutions established in 1906
1906 establishments in the Portuguese Empire